The 1993 Benson & Hedges Cup was the twenty-second edition of cricket's Benson & Hedges Cup.  It was an English limited overs county cricket tournament which was held between 27 April and 10 July 1993.  The tournament was won by Derbyshire County Cricket Club who defeated Lancashire County Cricket Club by 6 runs in the final at Lord's.

Format
In the late 1980s the Test and County Cricket Board (TCCB) created a Structure Working Party under the chairmanship of Michael Murray to identify weaknesses in the structure of county cricket and suggest improvements. It reported in 1992. Its main recommendations were the reduction of the County Championship from 22 matches a side to seventeen (each of the eighteen first-class counties playing each other once), all County Championship matches to be played over four days, the Sunday League to be extended from 40 overs a side to 50 overs, and the dropping of the zonal stage of the Benson & Hedges Cup, which would instead be played as a knockout.

These changes were adopted in advance of the 1993 season by a vote of eleven to eight (with one abstention) at a special meeting of the TCCB on 19 May 1992. Although it was agreed that the system should last for a minimum of three years, it was agreed to revert to a zonal system at the TCCB winter meeting on 8–9 December 1993. The changes were implemented in time for the 1995 season.

Fixtures and results

Preliminary round

First round

Quarter-finals

Semi-finals

Final

References

See also
Benson & Hedges Cup

Benson & Hedges Cup seasons
1993 in English cricket